For the NBC western anthology, see Frontier (1955 TV series).

Frontier Justice is a CBS television Western anthology series which had thirty-one telecasts over the summers of 1958, 1959, and 1961. It was a repackaging of episodes from CBS's Dick Powell's Zane Grey Theatre, and was hosted by Lew Ayres, Melvyn Douglas, and Ralph Bellamy, one each summer. The program was a production of Four Star Television.

References
 

1950s Western (genre) television series
1960s Western (genre) television series
CBS original programming
1958 American television series debuts
1961 American television series endings
1950s American anthology television series
1960s American anthology television series
Television series by Four Star Television
Television series by 20th Century Fox Television
Black-and-white American television shows